Forest Hills is a neighborhood in east Dallas, Texas (USA).  It is located near White Rock Lake. that borders Little Forest Hills

Boundaries 

Forest Hills is a neighborhood surrounding Forest Hills Boulevard. It lies directly south of White Rock Lake with many grand homes fronting Garland Road.

Education 
The neighborhood is served by the Dallas Independent School District.  Children in the neighborhood attend Alex Sanger Elementary School (located within the neighborhood), W. H. Gaston Middle School, Skyline High School and Bryan Adams High School.

References

External links
http://www.foresthillsdallas.org/
Forest Hills edition of the Black White Read online community newspapers